ISO 31-8 is the part of international standard ISO 31 that defines names and symbols for quantities and units related to physical chemistry and molecular physics.

Quantities and units

Notes
In the tables of quantities and their units, the ISO 31-8 standard shows symbols for substances as subscripts (e.g., cB, wB, pB). It also notes that it is generally advisable to put symbols for substances and their states in parentheses on the same line, as in c(H2SO4).

Normative annexes

Annex A: Names and symbols of the chemical elements
This annex contains a list of elements by atomic number, giving the names and standard symbols of the chemical elements from atomic number 1 (hydrogen, H) to 109 (unnilennium, Une).

The list given in ISO 31-8:1992 was quoted from the 1998 IUPAC "Green Book" Quantities, Units and Symbols in Physical Chemistry and adds in some cases in parentheses the Latin name for information, where the standard symbol has no relation to the English name of the element. Since the 1992 edition of the standard was published, some elements with atomic number above 103 have been discovered and renamed.

Annex B: Symbols for chemical elements and nucleides
Symbols for chemical elements shall be written in roman (upright) type. The symbol is not followed by a full-stop.

Examples:
 H He C Ca

Attached subscripts or superscripts specifying a nucleotide or molecule have the following meanings and positions:
 The nucleon number (mass number) is shown in the left superscript position (e.g., 14N)
 The number of atoms of a nucleotide is shown in the right subscript position (e.g., 14N2)
 The proton number (atomic number) may be indicated in the left subscript position (e.g., 64Gd)
 If necessary, a state of ionization or an excited state may be indicated in the right superscript position (e.g., state of ionization Na+)

Annex C: pH
pH is defined operationally as follows. For a solution X, first measure the electromotive force EX of the galvanic cell

reference electrode | concentrated solution of KCl | solution X | H2 | Pt

and then also measure the electromotive force ES of a galvanic cell that differs from the above one only by the replacement of the solution X of unknown pH, pH(X), by a solution S of a known standard pH, pH(S). Then obtain the pH of X as
pH(X) = pH(S) + (ES − EX) F / (RT ln 10)
where
F is the Faraday constant;
R is the molar gas constant;
T is the thermodynamic temperature.

Defined this way, pH is a quantity of dimension 1, that is it has no unit. Values pH(S) for a range of standard solutions S are listed in Definitions of pH scales, standard reference values, measurement of pH, and related terminology. Pure Appl. Chem. (1985), 57, pp 531–542, where further details can be found.

pH has no fundamental meaning; its official definition is a practical one. However, in the restricted range of dilute aqueous solutions having amount-of-substance concentrations less than 0.1 mol/L, and being neither strongly alkaline nor strongly acidic (2 < pH < 12), the definition is such that

pH = −log10[c(H+) y1 / (1 mol/L)] ± 0.02

where c(H+) denotes the amount-of-substance concentration of hydrogen ion H+ and y1 denotes the activity coefficient of a typical uni-univalent electrolyte in the solution.

Physical chemistry
Molecular physics
00031-08